The green-tailed towhee (Pipilo chlorurus) is the smallest towhee, but is still one of the larger members of the American sparrow family Passerellidae.

Its breeding range covers most of the interior Western United States, with a winter range in Mexico and the southern edge of the Southwestern United States.

This bird can be recognized by the bright green stripes on the edge of its wings. It has a distinct white throat and a rufous cap.

It is fairly tame, but often stays hidden under a bush. It is fairly common in habitats with sagebrush and other such bushes. It is uncommonly seen because of its tendency to stay under cover.

References

Further reading

Book

Thesis
 Beedy EC. Ph.D. (1982). Bird Community Structure in Coniferous Forests of Yosemite National Park, California. University of California, Davis, United States, California.
 Kerley L. Ph.D. (1994). Bird responses to habitat fragmentation caused by sagebrush management in a Wyoming sagebrush steppe ecosystem. University of Wyoming, United States, Wyoming.

Articles
Berry ME & Bock CE. (1998). Effects of habitat and landscape characteristics on avian breeding distributions in Colorado foothills shrub. Southwestern Naturalist. vol 43, no 4. pp. 453–461.
Bulluck L, Fleishman E, Betrus C & Blair R. (2006). Spatial and temporal variations in species occurrence rate affect the accuracy of occurrence models. Global Ecology and Biogeography. vol 15, no 1. pp. 27–38.
Dobbs RC & Martin PR. (2000). Winter nocturnal roost sites and behavior of some desert passerines in western Texas. Western Birds. vol 31, no 2. pp. 120–122.
Erickson RA & Wurster TE. (1998). Confirmation of nesting in Mexico for four bird species from the Sierra San Pedro Martir, Baja California. Wilson Bulletin. vol 110, no 1. pp. 118–120.
Ewert DN. (1980). Recognition of Conspecific Song by the Rufous-Sided Towhee Pipilo-Erythrophthalmus. Animal Behaviour. vol 28, no 2. pp. 379–386.
Garber D. (1969). Green-Tailed Towhee in Racine. Passenger Pigeon. vol 31, no 4.
Jehle G, Savidge JA & Kotliar NB. (2006). Green-tailed Towhee response to prescribed fire in montane shrubland. Condor. vol 108, no 3. pp. 634–646.
Knopf FL, Sedgwick JA & Inkley DB. (1990). Regional Correspondence among Shrubsteppe Bird Habitats. Condor. vol 92, no 1. pp. 45–53.
Martin TE. (1996). Fitness costs of resource overlap among coexisting bird species. Nature. vol 380, no 6572. pp. 338–340.
Martin TE. (1998). Are microhabitat preferences of coexisting species under selection and adaptive?. Ecology. vol 79, no 2. pp. 656–670.
Martin TE, Scott J & Menge C. (2000). Nest predation increases with parental activity: Separating nest site and parental activity effects. Proceedings of the Royal Society Biological Sciences Series B. vol 267, no 1459. pp. 2287–2293.
Meritt JK. (1976). Green-Tailed Towhee in Gloucester County New-Jersey USA. Cassinia. vol 56, no 28.
Mindell DP & Sites JWJ. (1987). Tissue Expression Patterns of Avian Isozymes a Preliminary Study of Phylogenetic Applications. Systematic Zoology. vol 36, no 2. pp. 137–152.
Morton ML. (1991). POSTFLEDGING DISPERSAL OF GREEN-TAILED TOWHEES TO A SUB-ALPINE MEADOW. Condor. vol 93, no 2. pp. 466–468.
Noson AC, Schmitz RA & Miller RF. (2006). Influence of fire and Juniper encroachment on birds in high-elevation sagebrush steppe. Western North American Naturalist. vol 66, no 3. pp. 343–353.
Odell EA & Knight RL. (2001). Songbird and medium-sized mammal communities associated with exurban development in Pitkin County, Colorado. Conservation Biology. vol 15, no 4. pp. 1143–1150.
Palacios MG & Martin TE. (2006). Incubation period and immune function: a comparative field study among coexisting birds. Oecologia. vol 146, no 4. pp. 505–512.
Pavlacky DC & Anderson SH. (2004). Comparative habitat use in a juniper woodland bird community. Western North American Naturalist. vol 64, no 3. pp. 376–384.
Ponshair JF. (1980). 8 Species of Birds New for Ottawa County Michigan USA. Jack Pine Warbler. vol 58, no 3.
Sedgwick JA. (1987). Avian Habitat Relationships in Pinyon-Juniper Woodland. Wilson Bulletin. vol 99, no 3. pp. 413–431.
Spicer GS. (1978). A New Species and Several New Host Records of Avian Nasal Mites Acarina Rhinonyssinae Turbinoptinae. Journal of Parasitology. vol 64, no 5. pp. 891–894.
Zink RM & Blackwell RC. (1996). Patterns of allozyme, mitochondrial DNA, and morphometric variation in four sparrow genera. Auk. vol 113, no 1. pp. 59–67.
Zwartjes PW & Farley GH. (1998). Observations of breeding site fidelity of green-tailed towhees (Pipilo chlorurus) in central New Mexico. Texas Journal of Science. vol 50, no 3. pp. 258–261.

External links

 Green-tailed towhee photos and article at fireflyforest.net
 
 
 
 
 
 Green-tailed towhee Species Account – Cornell Lab of Ornithology
 

green-tailed towhee
Native birds of the Western United States
green-tailed towhee
green-tailed towhee